The four-man bobsleigh results at the 1956 Winter Olympics in Cortina d'Ampezzo, Italy. The competition was held on Friday and Saturday, 3 and 4 February 1956.

Medallists

Results

(*) NOTE: Jan Dąbrowski replaced Zbigniew Skowroński after two runs.

References

External links
1956 bobsleigh four-man results
Wallechinsky, David (1984). "Bobsleigh: Four-Man". In The Complete Book of the Winter Olympics. New York: Penguin Books. p. 561.

Bobsleigh at the 1956 Winter Olympics